CIRE-TV is a community channel in the community of High Prairie, Alberta.

External links
 

IRE
Canadian community channels
IRE
Television channels and stations established in 1983
1983 establishments in Alberta